Emmerthal is a municipality in the Hameln-Pyrmont district, in Lower Saxony, Germany. It is situated on the river Weser, approximatively 6 km south of Hameln. Its seat is in the village Kirchohsen.

In 1973, the Emmerthal was formed by merging the previously independent municipalities of Amelgatzen, Bessinghausen, Börry, Brockensen, Emmern, Esperde, Frenke, Grohnde, Hagenohsen, Hajen, Hämelschenburg, Kirchohsen, Latferde, Lüntorf, Ohr, Voremberg, Welsede.

The Grohnde Nuclear Power Plant is located in the Emmerthal.

From 1933 to 1937, the National Socialists held their national thanksgiving festival in a field on the nearby Bückeberg hill.

References 

Hameln-Pyrmont